Cychropsis bousqueti is a species of ground beetle in the subfamily of Carabinae. It was described by Deuve in 1991.

References

bousqueti
Beetles described in 1991